Free D.C! is a 1991 video game published by Cineplay Interactive.

Gameplay
Free D.C! is a game in which the machines took control of the world in the early 21st century, and hundreds of years later the surviving humans start to fight back.

Reception

Charles Ardai reviewed the game for Computer Gaming World, and stated that "Cineplay can do better than this — and almost certainly will. Free D.C! is ambitious, well-intentioned and promising, but it is also a failure."

Duncan MacDonald for Zero praised the character portraits and the storyline, calling it "an adventure game for people who are crap at adventures."

Joyce Worley for Electronic Games gave the game a B- and praised the sci-fi premise and its simple interface.

William R. Trotter for Game Players PC Entertainment complained that the game was a fizzle rather than a delight: "Given the kind of talent assembled for this project, game players had every right to expect something much better than this drab exercise."

Amiga Power called its chances of success "Slim, to say the least" but offered the possibility that "The PC version wasn't too hot but it's said improvements have been made for the Amiga so there's hope for it yet."

Reviews
ASM (Aktueller Software Markt) - May, 1992
Datormagazin Vol 1992 No 12 (Jul 1992)
Play Time - Jul, 1992
Power Play - Jul, 1992
PC Joker - Jan, 1992

References

1991 video games
Adventure games
Detective video games
DOS games
DOS-only games
Dystopian video games
Post-apocalyptic video games
Video games about robots
Video games developed in the United States
Video games set in the 21st century
Video games set in the future
Video games set in Washington, D.C.
Video games set in zoos
Video games with digitized sprites